Clifford E. Dorr (August 11, 1920 – June 1978) from Chippewa Falls, Wisconsin was a member of the Wisconsin State Assembly.

Biography
Dorr was born in New Auburn, Wisconsin. He went on to serve in the United States Army during World War II. From 1955 to 1959, he was Sheriff of Chippewa County, Wisconsin.

Political career
Dorr was elected to the Assembly in 1958. He was a Democrat.

References

People from Chippewa Falls, Wisconsin
Wisconsin sheriffs
Military personnel from Wisconsin
United States Army soldiers
United States Army personnel of World War II
1920 births
1978 deaths
20th-century American politicians
People from New Auburn, Wisconsin
Democratic Party members of the Wisconsin State Assembly